Eli Y. Adashi is an American physician-scientist-executive who served as the Fifth Dean of Medicine and Biological Sciences at Brown University. Adashi  is presently a tenured Professor of Medical Science with the Warren Alpert Medical School of Brown University. He is a member of the National Academy of Medicine, the New York Academy of Sciences, and the Association of American Physicians (AAP). Adashi is also a fellow of the American Association for the Advancement of Science (AAAS), the Hastings Center Ethics Research Institute, and the Royal Society of Medicine.

Early life and education 
Adashi was born in Haifa, Israel (British Mandate Palestine) in 1945, the only child of German-speaking professionals who departed Europe in the mid-1930s. Adashi’s mother, an Austrian national by birth, was a highly successful kindergarten teacher. Adashi’s father, a Czech national by birth, was an engineer whose lifelong career was spent with the Nesher Cement Factory in Haifa. A member of the first graduating class of the Tel Aviv University School of Medicine, Adashi received his Medical degree in 1973. Following a Rotating Internship at the Meir Medical Center, Adashi relocated to the United States for Residency Training in Obstetrics and Gynecology at Tufts University School of Medicine. Adashi received training in Reproductive Endocrinology and Reproductive Biology at Johns Hopkins University School of Medicine and at the University of California at San Diego School of Medicine, respectively.

Appointments 
Adashi's first faculty appointment was as an Associate Professor and Director of the Division of Reproductive Endocrinology with the Department of Obstetrics and Gynecology at the University of Maryland School of Medicine. Upon the passing of M. Carlyle Crenshaw, Jr., MD, then the Chair of the Department of Obstetrics and Gynecology, Adashi was appointed Acting Chair, a role he served in through 1996. In 1996, Adashi became the John A. Dixon Endowed Presidential Professor and Department of Obstetrics and Gynecology at the University of Utah Health Sciences Center. He founded the ovarian cancer program in 1999 at the Huntsman Cancer Research Institute. In 2004, Adashi was appointed as the Frank L. Day Professor of Biology and the Dean of Medicine and Biological Sciences at Brown University.  Upon his appointment, Adashi was tasked by Brown's Corporation and Administration to expand the medical student body (then 60-70 matriculants/year), codify the then piloted Pre-Med application process, design a new integrated medical education curriculum, rank in the top quartile of U.S. medical schools, and reconstitute the divisional leadership team. Adashi was also to establish a heretofore absent Medical School facility off of College Hill. The MD class of 2011, ninety six strong, was the largest ever. Pre-Med matriculants (~1% of ~3,000 applicants/year) became a regular component of the student body that was scholastically indistinguishable from Ivy peers. A new and integrated preclinical curriculum was established replete with a novel two year-long Doctoring course and an innovative Scholarly Concentration Program. A rise of 12 rungs in the U.S. News & World Report research rankings over the last four years tied Brown's Medical School with its counterparts at Dartmouth College and the University of Iowa while outranking 75% of all accredited U.S. medical schools. The vote of confidence afforded by the Warren Alpert Foundation's $100 million gift assured the establishment of a Medical School facility off of College Hill. With accreditation of the Medical School secure through 2013, re-designed and improved medical student advising, upgraded physical facilities, expanded compensation for pre-clinical teaching faculty, expanded summer research assistantships, greatly improved US Medical Licensing Examination test scores, strong residency matching record, three new combined degree programs (MD/MPH, MD/MPP and MD/MPA), new online admission (Banner®) and assessment(OASIS®) systems, increasingly paperless faculty affairs office, improved outreach to alumni, a strategic communication and marketing plan, substantially increased total endowment (to $327 million; an 80% increase since 2004), a growing financial aid endowment (to $69 million; a 50% increase since 2004), an ambitious annual fund, growing balanced budgets (to $130 million; a 60% increase since 2004), the introduction of the national AOA honor society, 2 new endowed chairs committed to ongoing innovation in medical education and a new medical education building in the planning phases, Brown's newly named Alpert Medical School was soundly positioned for further progress.

Adashi was elected to the Institute of Medicine (now the National Academia of Medicine) in 1999 wherein he served on multiple committees.

A former Franklin fellow and Senior Adviser on Global Women's Health to the Secretary of State Office of Global Women's Issues (1st term of the Obama Administration), Adashi is a member of the Advisory Council of The Hastings Center, a member of the Board of Governors of Tel Aviv University, and the chair of the Medical Executive Committee and the Medical Advisory Council of the Jones Foundation for Reproductive Medicine. Adashi is a former member of the Board of Directors of Physicians for Human Rights and of the Council on Foreign Relations, the Global Agenda Council on Population Growth of the World Economic Forum, and the Medicare Evidence Development & Coverage Advisory Committee (MEDCAC) of the Centers for Medicare and Medicaid Services (CMS). Adashi is also a former advisor to the National Committee for Quality Assurance (NCQA), the World Health Organization (WHO), the World Bank, the Rockefeller Foundation, and the Bill and Melinda Gates Foundation. A former Examiner and Director of the Division of Reproductive Endocrinology of the American Board of Obstetrics and Gynecology (ABOG), Adashi served as President of the Society for Reproductive Endocrinology and Infertility (SREI; 1998-1999), the Society for Gynecologic Investigation (SGI; 1999-2000), and the American Gynecological and Obstetrical Society (AGOS; 2002-2003).

Research contributions 

Adashi was the recipient of continuous National Institute of Health (NIH) funding from 1985 to 2005 inclusive of a Research Career Development Award. Mentor to over 50 postdoctoral trainees and the author or co-author of over 500  PubMed-indexed peer-reviewed publications,[17] Adashi edited or co-edited 16 books in the general area of Reproductive Medicine with an emphasis on Ovarian Biology.[18] Adashi's work also saw press with the New York Times, the Washington Post, the Boston Globe, the Huffington Post and several other media venues. Multiple academic presentations were delivered in Europe, Japan, Korea, China, Taiwan, Australia, and South America.

Adashi's service with the NIH included membership with the National Council of the National Institute of Child Health and Human Development (1997-2001), the Reproductive Endocrinology Study Section (1988-1992), and the Selection Committee of the Reproductive Scientist Development Program (1988-2005). 

Adashi is the former Editor-In- Chief of Seminars in Reproductive Medicine and a former Associate Editor of Endocrinology, Journal of the Society for Gynecologic Investigation, Reproductive Medicine Review, Seminars in Reproductive Endocrinology, Reproductive Medicine Review, and Reviews in Endocrine and Metabolic Disorders.[18]

Adashi's research focused on the biology of the ovary and the role of growth factors and cytokines in this context. Ongoing scholarly contributions to medical education and to the discipline of reproductive medicine are equally noteworthy. Since 2008, Adashi has undertaken to focus on matters of policy at the nexus of medicine, law, ethics, and social justice.[19]

Awards and recognition 
 USPHS Research Career Development Award (RCDA), NICHD, NIH (1986-1991)
 The President's Achievement Award, Society for Gynecologic Investigation (1989)
 Annual Research Award, Society for the Study of Reproduction (SSR) (1996)
 Distinguished Scientist Award, the American Society for Reproductive Medicine (ASRM) (1999)
 Fellow ad Eundem, The Royal College of Obstetricians and Gynaecologists (FRCOG) (2000)
 President d’Honneur à titre Etranger, The Societé Francaise de Gynécologie (2001)
 Franklin Fellow, US Department of State, Office of Global Women's Issues (2009-2010)
 W.W. Keen Award for Outstanding Contributions to Medicine, Brown University (2010)
 SRI-Pardi Distinguished Scientist Award, The Society for Reproductive Investigation (2015)
 Doctor Honoris Causa, The Poznan University of Medical Sciences, Poznan, Poland (2016)
 Doctor Honoris Causa, The University of Ottawa, Ottawa, Canada (2018)
 Lifetime Achievement Award, The American Society for Reproductive Medicine (2018)
 Certificate of Special Congressional Recognition, Members of US Congress (Sponsor: James R. Langevin) (2018)
Honorary Member, European Society of Human Reproduction and Embryology (2019)
Elected as a Fellow of The Hastings Center Ethics Research Institute (2020)

Personal life 
Adashi is married to Toni Sach-Silbermanm, an actress. They have one son, Judah E. Adashi, who is a composer and a member of the Johns Hopkins University Peabody Institute Faculty.

References 

Living people
American obstetricians
20th-century births
Brown University faculty
20th-century American Jews
Harvard School of Public Health alumni
Tel Aviv University alumni
Year of birth missing (living people)
21st-century American Jews
Members of the National Academy of Medicine